The Indiana Hoosiers football statistical leaders are individual statistical leaders of the Indiana Hoosiers football program in various categories, including passing,  rushing, receiving, total offense, defensive stats, and kicking. Within those areas, the lists identify single-game, single-season, and career leaders. The Hoosiers represent Indiana University Bloomington in the NCAA's Big Ten Conference.

Although Indiana began competing in intercollegiate football in 1892, the school's official record book considers the "modern era" to have begun in 1948. Records from before this year are often incomplete and inconsistent, and they are generally not included in these lists.

These lists are dominated by more recent players for several reasons:
 Since 1948, seasons have increased from 10 games to 11 and then 12 games in length.
 The NCAA didn't allow freshmen to play varsity football until 1972 (with the exception of the World War II years), allowing players to have four-year careers.
 Bowl games only began counting toward single-season and career statistics in 2002. However, Indiana has only played in five bowl games since then: the 2007 Insight Bowl, 2015 Pinstripe Bowl, 2016 Foster Farms Bowl, 2020 Gator Bowl, and 2021 Outback Bowl.
 Indiana has broken school team records in offensive yards and points during the tenure of coach Kevin Wilson (2011-2016).

These lists are updated through Indiana's game against Wisconsin on December 5, 2020.

Passing

Passing yards

Passing touchdowns

Rushing

Rushing yards

Rushing touchdowns

Receiving

Receptions

Receiving yards

Receiving touchdowns

Total offense
Total offense is the sum of passing and rushing statistics. It does not include receiving or returns.

Total offense yards

Total touchdowns

Defense

Interceptions

Tackles

Sacks

Kicking

Field goals made

Field goal percentage

Longest field goals

References

Lists of college football statistical leaders by team